The 2014 FedEx Cup Playoffs was the series of four golf tournaments that determined the season champion on the U.S.-based PGA Tour.
The Barclays – Ridgewood Country Club, Paramus, New Jersey
Deutsche Bank Championship – TPC Boston, Norton, Massachusetts
BMW Championship – Cherry Hills Country Club, Englewood, Colorado
Tour Championship – East Lake Golf Club, Atlanta, Georgia

These were the eighth FedEx Cup playoffs since their inception in 2007.

The point distributions can be seen here.

Regular season rankings

The Barclays
The Barclays was played August 21–24. Of the 125 players eligible to play in the event, three did not enter: Dustin Johnson (ranked 6), Jason Dufner (57) and Steve Stricker (103). Of the 122 entrants, 79 made the second-round cut at 143 (+1). With more than 78 players making the cut the field was further reduced to 70 after the third round.

Hunter Mahan won by two strokes over Stuart Appleby, Jason Day, and Cameron Tringale and moved from 62nd place to first place in the standings. The top 100 players in the points standings advanced to the Deutsche Bank Championship. This included seven players who were outside the top 100 prior to The Barclays: Bo Van Pelt (ranked 104th to 73rd), Stewart Cink (109 to 77), Andrés Romero (110 to 92), Danny Lee (116 to 96), Paul Casey (118 to 85), Gonzalo Fernández-Castaño (119 to 81), and Morgan Hoffmann (124 to 72). Seven players started the tournament within the top 100 but ended the tournament outside the top 100, ending their playoff chances: Jonas Blixt (ranked 92nd to 102nd), Kevin Kisner (93 to 104), Nick Watney (94 to 105), Luke Guthrie (95 to 106), Retief Goosen (96 to 103), Rory Sabbatini (97 to 108), and Brian Davis (100 to 110).

Par 71 course

Deutsche Bank Championship
The Deutsche Bank Championship was played August 29 – September 1. Of the 100 players eligible to play in the event, seven did not play: Dustin Johnson (ranked 14), Sergio García (15), Justin Rose (20), Tim Clark (38), Graeme McDowell (40), Jason Dufner (74), and Paul Casey (85). Of the 93 entrants, 80 made the second-round cut at 145 (+3). The field was further reduced to 73 after the third round.

Chris Kirk won by two strokes over Russell Henley, Billy Horschel, and Geoff Ogilvy and moved into first place in the standings. The top 70 players in the points standings advanced to the BMW Championship. This included six players who were outside the top 70 prior to the Deutsche Bank Championship: Horschel (82 to 20), Ogilvy (100 to 24), Chesson Hadley (84 to 57), Carl Pettersson (93 to 66), Morgan Hoffmann (72 to 68), and Ben Crane (78 to 69). Six players started the tournament within the top 70 but ended the tournament outside the top 70, ending their playoff chances: Ryo Ishikawa (56 to 72), Justin Hicks (58 to 75), Ben Martin (63 to 76), Scott Langley (65 to 77), Shawn Stefani (67 to 83), and Scott Brown (70 to 85).

Par 71 course

BMW Championship
The BMW Championship was played September 4–7. Of the 70 players eligible to play in the event, only one, Dustin Johnson (ranked 22), did not play. There was no cut.

Billy Horschel won by two strokes over Bubba Watson and moved to second on the points list. Two players played their way into the Tour Championship: Morgan Hoffmann (ranked 68 to ranked 21) and Ryan Palmer (37 to 23). Two players played their way out of the Tour Championship: Stuart Appleby (26 to 31) and Keegan Bradley (28 to 33). Hoffmann, who started the playoffs ranked 124th, played his way into each playoff event.

The top 30 players in FedEx Cup points after this event advanced to the Tour Championship and also earned spots in the 2015 Masters Tournament, U.S. Open, and (British) Open Championship.

The FedEx Cup points were reset after the BMW Championship. Points were allocated according to a player's position in the standings. The player in first place has 2,500 points, and the player in 30th has 210. This means that all 30 remaining players will have at least a mathematical chance to secure the season crown, and any of the top five players can claim the FedEx Cup with a win in the Tour Championship.

Par 72 course

Reset points
The points were reset after the BMW Championship.

Tour Championship
The Tour Championship was played September 11−14. Of the 30 players eligible to play in the event, only one, Dustin Johnson (ranked 30), did not play. There was no cut. Billy Horschel won the tournament by three strokes over Jim Furyk and Rory McIlroy. After starting the playoffs in 69th place and missing the cut in the first playoff tournament, Horschel finished T-2, win, and win in the next three events to win the FedEx Cup.

Par 70 course

Final leaderboard

For the full list see here.

Table of qualifying players
Table key:

* First-time Playoffs participant
† MDF – made cut, did not finish (i.e. cut after third round)

References

External links
Coverage on the PGA Tour's official site

FedEx Cup
FedEx Cup Playoffs